Lewis Francis Byington (May 24, 1868 – May 7, 1943) was an American lawyer, author, and Democratic politician who served on the San Francisco Board of Supervisors (1898–1900) and as District Attorney of San Francisco (1900–1905).

Early life and education
Byington was born on May 24, 1868, in Downieville, California, a historic mining town in Sierra County, northern California. He was a son of Lewis Byington, an early pioneer of Sierra County, and Catherine (Freehill) Byington. His grandmother was Abigail Webster, a cousin of Daniel Webster.

His sister, Mary Emma Byington, was married to Tirey L. Ford, 18th California Attorney General and General Counsel for the United Railroads.

Byington went to public school in Downieville. He graduated from Santa Clara College, now the University of Santa Clara, and in 1887 graduated from the University of California Hastings College of the Law. He subsequently practiced law in San Francisco.

Career
Lewis Byington was a member of the California bar. His practice was in the Supreme Court and Federal Courts of California.

In 1898 he was elected to the San Francisco Board of Supervisors. 
In 1899 he was elected San Francisco District Attorney, serving from 1900–1905. As District Attorney, he prosecuted the murderer Cordelia Botkin. He was elected a further two times.

Byington was president of the San Francisco civil service commission under Mayor James Rolph. 

In 1935, Byington became president of the San Francisco Public Utilities Commission, which provides water and electric power services to the city. He held this position until his death in 1943. As president, Byington oversaw the completion of the aqueduct and tunnels of the Hetch Hetchy system that brought water to San Francisco.

Private life and affiliations
Byington was unmarried. In retirement, he made his home in San Francisco.

He was vice president of the California Historic Landmarks League and served as president of the Native Sons of the Golden West. On September 15, 1912, Byington acted as chairman of the ceremonies, during the dedication of the new NSGW, speaking to the audience about the history of the building and the difficulties in its completion.

He was also a member of the University of California Club, the National Geographic Society, the San Francisco Lodge, and the Benevolent and Protective Order of Elks. He was a principal speaker for the celebration of California's admission to the Union.

Death
On May 7, 1943, Byington died of pneumonia at Stanford Hospital, San Francisco. He was 75 years old. Funeral services were held at St. Mary's Cathedral. He was buried at the Holy Cross Mausoleum.

Publications
Byington wrote the following books:

See also
San Francisco District Attorneys

References

External links

 
 San Francisco, Its Builders, Past and Present: Pictorial and Biographical

1868 births
1943 deaths
Lawyers from San Francisco
Santa Clara University alumni
University of California, Hastings College of the Law alumni
People from Downieville, California
Members of the California State Assembly
District attorneys in California